Born Free is the twentieth studio album by American pop singer Andy Williams and was released on April 10, 1967, by Columbia Records and includes half a dozen songs associated with movies or musicals. Two of these tracks, however, originated in the scores of the films indicated on the album jacket but had lyrics added later: the melody for "Strangers in the Night" was written for A Man Could Get Killed, and "Somewhere My Love" began as "Lara's Theme" from Doctor Zhivago.

The album made its first appearance on Billboard Top LP's chart in the issue dated May 13, 1967, and remained there for 79 weeks, peaking at number five. The album received Gold certification from the Recording Industry Association of America on July 6, 1967, and that same month it began 11 weeks on the UK album chart, where it reached number 22.

The single from the album, "Music to Watch Girls By", was available two months before the album was released and first appeared on the Billboard Hot 100 chart in the issue of the magazine dated March 25, eventually reaching number 34 over the course of eight weeks. The song performed even better on the Easy Listening chart after debuting in the issue dated April 1 and spending a week at number two during a 13-week stay.  It debuted on the UK charts shortly thereafter, on May 6, and stayed around for six weeks, peaking at number 33. The song was reissued there in 1999 and spent another six weeks on the chart, this time reaching number nine.  
    
The album was released on compact disc for the first time as one of two albums on one CD by Collectables Records on March 23, 1999, the other album being Williams's Columbia release from the fall of 1967, Love, Andy.  It was also released as one of two albums on one CD by Sony Music Distribution on May 14, 2001, paired this time with Williams's Columbia album from December 1966, In the Arms of Love. The original album covers are displayed side by side on the front of these CD reissues, and it is clear that the color of the Born Free cover has been enhanced considerably for the Collectables release, as Williams's suntanned face from the original LP cover shown on the Sony release now has a more psychedelic orange glow. The Collectables CD was included in a box set entitled Classic Album Collection, Vol. 1, which contains 17 of his studio albums and three compilations and was released on June 26, 2001.

Reception
William Ruhlmann of Allmusic remarked that this album "marked a notable contemporization of the Williams formula. On his most recent albums, The Shadow of Your Smile and In the Arms of Love, he had leaned toward Brazilian sounds, recording more obscure material and several standards from the interwar period." He also explained why the change may have happened: "In the Arms of Love, released only four months before Born Free, had sold disappointingly. Williams reacted by dropping the bossa nova and the oldies and looked more to the recent pop charts for covers like Bobby Hebb's 'Sunny.'" Ruhlmann suggested that Williams was trying to reach as wide of an audience as possible. "At a time when non-rock pop singers were beginning to be marginalized, Williams successfully threaded the needle, reassuring his older listeners while proving adaptable to current trends."

Track listing

Side one
 "Born Free" from Born Free (Don Black, John Barry) – 2:27
 "Somewhere My Love" (Paul Francis Webster, Maurice Jarre) – 2:38
 "Spanish Eyes" (Charlie Singleton, Eddie Snyder, Bert Kaempfert) – 3:04
 "Strangers in the Night" (Charlie Singleton, Eddie Snyder, Bert Kaempfert) – 2:32
 "Sherry!" from Sherry! (James Lipton, Laurence Rosenthal) – 2:27
 "Music to Watch Girls By" (Tony Velona, Sid Ramin) – 2:38

Side two
 "I Want to Be Free" (Tommy Boyce, Bobby Hart) – 3:20
 "Alfie" from Alfie (Hal David, Burt Bacharach) – 2:55
 "Then You Can Tell Me Goodbye " (John D. Loudermilk) – 2:37
 "Sunny" (Bobby Hebb) – 3:16
 "I Will Wait for You" from The Umbrellas of Cherbourg (Jacques Demy, Norman Gimbel, Michel Legrand) – 2:42
 "You Are Where Everything Is" (Nick DeCaro) – 3:06

Personnel

This was Williams's 13th studio album for Columbia Records and the first of those that was not produced by Robert Mersey. The credits are from the liner notes for the original album:

Andy Williams – vocals
Nick DeCaro - arranger (except as noted), producer
J. Hill - arranger ("Strangers in the Night", "I Will Wait for You")
Eddie Karam - arranger (" Spanish Eyes", "Sherry!")
Ray Gerhardt - recording engineer
Bob Cato - photography

References

Bibliography

1967 albums
Andy Williams albums
Columbia Records albums
Covers albums